Welcome to Hell is the debut studio album by English extreme metal band Venom. It was released in December 1981, through Neat Records, at the culmination of the new wave of British heavy metal movement.

The album was re-released by Sanctuary Records in 2002.

Background
Venom's original personnel came from three different bands: Guillotine, Oberon and Dwarfstar. In 1979, Conrad "Cronos" Lant applied for a job at Impulse Studios in Wallsend as an audio-visual engineer for Neat Records. Impulse would soon become the epicentre for a series of vital recordings from the new wave of British heavy metal movement on the Neat Records label. Lant trained as an assistant engineer and tape operator at the time, working with local bands while simultaneously playing guitar in a band named Album Graecum, which later became Dwarfstar. Lant was soon introduced to Jeffrey Dunn, who at the time was playing guitar for a Judas Priest cover band named Guillotine, and quickly struck up a friendship around their shared vision for creating a "mega-satanic band" who played dark, demonic music and used Satanic imagery. Dunn introduced Lant to his band, and Lant would soon leave Dwarfstar and join Guillotine, where he met drummer Tony Bray during their first rehearsal. Lant would find himself now playing rhythm guitar in a five-piece consisting of Clive Archer on vocals, Alan Winston on bass, Dunn on lead guitar and Bray on drums. The band would soon change their name to Venom after a suggestion by the band's roadie.

Writing and recording
Many of the earliest recordings of songs from the album were written by guitarist Jeffrey Dunn before eventual vocalist and bassist Conrad Lant even joined the band in November 1979. Lant introduced them to his original song ideas as he did not want to keep playing the same cover songs, and with Dunn he began writing new songs for the band. Lant had composed songs like "Sons of Satan", "Bloodlust" and "Welcome to Hell", while Dunn had composed songs like "Angel Dust", "Red Light Fever", "Buried Alive", "Raise the Dead" and "Live Like an Angel (Die Like a Devil)". Dunn and Lant redefined together these songs with a mutual collaboration and then, after unsuccessfully trying to convince the managing director at Impulse Studios where Lant was working at the time as a tape operator to allow Venom studio time to record, Lant decided to record one of the bands church hall rehearsals on a basic cassette recorder in late 1979 with original vocalist Clive Archer on vocals, Alan Winston on bass, Lant and Dunn on guitar and Bray on drums. They performed the tracks: "Angel Dust", "Red Light Fever", "Buried Alive", "Raise The Dead" and the band song "Venom". Unfortunately, as the band rehearsed in an old church hall, the sound was not very good.

In February 1980, Winston left the band less than a week before they were to play their first show at the Meth in Wallsend on 15 February 1980. Lant then took over bass guitar duties and soon after the band also decided on using stage names since they felt singing songs about Satanism and the occult with ordinary names didn't feel right. The band settled on more formidable and demonic names to better fit their images and their stage personalities. Archer becoming "Jesus Christ", Lant "Cronos", Bray "Abbadon" and Dunn "Mantas". After failing to win over the studio with their church hall rehearsals, Lant was able to convince studio engineer Mickey Sweeney to work a short recording session with the band (for free under the condition that Lant stay back every night in the studio and help him with other sessions) and even managed to persuade record company boss David Wood to get half a day in the studio for free. The recording session took place on 19 April 1980 and the band recorded three tracks: "Angel Dust", "Raise The Dead" and "Red Light Fever". Lant then made cassette copies of the 3 songs and sent them to various record companies, radio stations, music magazines and rock clubs. This demo tape is entitled Demon.

After some minor attention from local magazines in the summer of 1980 the band returned to the studio after some talks with their label; Neat Records, and it was decided that due to the high amount of volume of bands looking to record at the time the label would put an affordable deal together called the "£50 Demos" allowing each band 4 hours in the studio to record as many live songs as possible straight to 2 track master for £50's. However, Lant was unable to get the money, so he again agreed to work long hours in the studio to pay for the session. Once given the go ahead, Lant brought the band in on 10 October 1980 and began recording. Out of the 4 hour session the band recorded 6 tracks: "Sons Of Satan", "In League with Satan", "Angel Dust", "Live Like an Angel", "Schizo" (later retitled "Schizoid") and the band song "Venom". It was during this recording session that Lant was asked to sing lead vocals on "Live Like an Angel", and his bandmates, so impressed by his performance, decided to make Lant their new lead vocalist and Clive Archer was soon let go.

Venom thus became a trio, with "Cronos" on vocals and bass, "Mantas" on guitar and "Abaddon" on drums. After convincing Neat Records to take a chance and let Venom record a single, the band headed back to the studio in January 1981 and released their first professional recording material, a vinyl, 7" single titled In League with Satan / Live Like an Angel on 19 April 1981, one year to the day that the band recorded their first demo, Demon. Neat Records, impressed with the success and reception of the single, asked the band to record all their material. Venom once again returned to Impulse studios in August and over the course of only three days re-recorded all of the material they had, however, the label decided to release these re-recorded demos, unpolished and with little production values. The final product being the band's debut album Welcome to Hell, a collection of demos packaged with a cover.

Music and lyrics
The music of Welcome to Hell is described as a mix of heavy metal, punk metal and speed metal. The album had great influence on the emerging extreme metal genres of thrash, death and black metal due to the album sonically being very raw and loud, in part because the band members thought they were making a simple demo and not an actual album during the only three days they were recording in the studio. Lyrically, the songs explore themes such as hedonism, sexual depravity ("Live Like an Angel (Die Like a Devil)", "1000 Days in Sodom", "Red Light Fever", "Poison"), serial killing ("Schizoid"), drug use ("Angel Dust"), witchcraft ("Witching Hour") and Satanism ("Welcome to Hell", "In League with Satan"). Two tracks contain use of Biblical scripture, with the title track featuring a female voice reciting an extract from Psalm 23 and "1000 Days in Sodom" telling the story of the Biblical city of Sodom and the prevailing depravity and degradation as the city and its inhabitants are destroyed for their sins. The track "In League with Satan" opens with a reversed recording of a demonic-sounding voice using the backmasking technique. When played in reverse, the voice of Lant can be heard saying "Satan, raised in hell, I'm gonna burn your soul, crush your bones, I'm gonna make you bleed, you gonna bleed for me" can be heard. This is one of the earliest instances of Satanic subliminal messages in music.

Artwork

The album cover, designed by drummer Tony Bray, used the same graphics for the cover of the single In League with Satan / Live Like an Angel. The only differences are the format and color of the print (golden instead of white) and the title. The artwork consists of a black background where there is a golden circular pentacle, inside is the head of the Goat of Mendes, symbol of the Church of Satan, a stylised Baphomet with a fierce expression; above that is the band logo "Venom" and under the title of the disc in gothic characters. The five-pointed star is in turn circumscribed by two concentric circles. In the space between the two circumferences there are five Hebrew letters, each corresponding to a point on the star which takes on the value of Belial, Leviathan, Lucifer, Satan, indicating Earth, Water, Air, Fire; plus the southern tip which represents man. On the back cover is a photo of the band holding axes on Tynemouth beach near Newcastle. In the very first copies of the disc, a black and white mini-poster of the group was also included.

Release and reception

The album was released in Great Britain on Neat Records in December 1981. Early copies included a pink lyric sheet and a black and white mini-poster depicting the Venom members. The logo of the record company on the various vinyl LP prints varies in colour, ranging from silver to blue, green, white and red.

British journalist Geoff Barton stated in his 1981 five-star review of Welcome to Hell that the album had "the hi-fi dynamics of a 50-year-old pizza", and that it "brought a new meaning to the word 'cataclysmic' ". According to AllMusic journalist Eduardo Rivadavia, highlights of the album include "Welcome to Hell", "In League with Satan", "One Thousand Days in Sodom" and "Witching Hour"; Rivadavia said of "Witching Hour": "Possibly Venom's single most important track, in it you'll hear a number of stylistic devices which would later pervade all extreme metal genres, indeed become their most regularly abused clichés." Canadian journalist Martin Popoff wrote that "Welcome to Hell got a certain fabulously stupid impetus to it, despite the sub-bootleg quality recording, and Cronos quickly establishing himself as the most annoying voice in rock"; it should be considered "a record of historical metal relevance", but "not the band's most listenable product".

Tour
With stories of the bands chaotic shows that they were playing in old church halls becoming well known to locals, the band was granted an opportunity to play a show at a sports hall called Maecke Blyde in Poperinge, Belgium. Lant, wanting to get away from the UK to see what the response would be to the band from fans who knew nothing of them, jumped at the chance. The concert took place on 4 June 1982 and was attended by over 3,000 fans, and after a successful show in Poperinge the band now set their sights on the United States.

Legacy
Due to its unpolished sound as a result of it being recorded in only three days, author Dayal Patterson stated that the relatively low-fidelity of Welcome to Hell inspired numerous Norwegian metal bands, who considered it black metal. Patterson says that Welcome to Hell and Black Metal were both the genesis for the black metal genre, with the earlier album "where it was born."

In 2017, Rolling Stone ranked Welcome to Hell as 74th on their list of 'The 100 Greatest Metal Albums of All Time.'

The black metal band Mayhem borrowed their name from the instrumental track "Mayhem with Mercy" and covered the song "Witching Hour" on their EP Deathcrush. The German thrash metal band Sodom also reportedly named themselves in reference to the song "One Thousand Days in Sodom".

In addition to covering the song, Canadian parody metal band Zimmers Hole references "In League with Satan" in the title of their album When You Were Shouting at the Devil... We Were in League with Satan.

American punk band The Meatmen covered "In League With Satan" as the title track on their enhanced CD EP Evil In A League With Satan.

Track listing

Credits
Venom – producer, performers
 Conrad "Cronos" Lant – bass, vocals
 Jeffrey "Mantas" Dunn – guitars
 Tony "Abaddon" Bray – drums, artwork
Keith Nichol – producer, engineer

References

External links
 Welcome to Hell info on venomcollector.com

Venom (band) albums
1981 debut albums
Combat Records albums